Quincy Thomas Troupe, Jr. (born July 22, 1939) is an American poet, editor, journalist and professor emeritus at the University of California, San Diego, in La Jolla, California. He is best known as the biographer of Miles Davis, the jazz musician.

Early life
Troupe is the son of baseball catcher Quincy Trouppe (who added a second "P" to the family name while playing in Mexico to accommodate the Spanish pronunciation "Trou-pay"). As a teenager in 1955, he recalled hearing Miles Davis at a St. Louis, Missouri, fish joint, where some fellow patrons identified the 78 rpm juke-box record as "Donna", which was Davis' first recorded composition. (The record is most likely to have been the Charlie Parker Quintet session recorded for Savoy Records on May 8, 1947.)

In his book Miles and Me Troupe recalls the experience:

As a young man Troupe was athletic and attended Grambling State University on a basketball scholarship. However, after his first year he quit and subsequently joined the United States Army, where he was stationed in France and playing on the Army basketball team. While in France he had a chance encounter with the noted French Existentialist philosopher, Jean-Paul Sartre, who recommended that Troupe try his hand at poetry.

When he returned to civilian life, Troupe moved to Los Angeles, where he became a regular presence at the Watts Writers Workshop and began working in a more jazz-based style. It was on a tour with the Watts group that he first began his academic life as a teacher. The Watts Writers Workshop was located in a building that also had a theater, allowing members to do readings, workshops, plays and presentations. It was a meeting point for many in the Black Power movement, Black Arts Movement and the civil rights movement and through it Troupe met many individuals involved in other cities including Ishmael Reed (Umbra Group), James Baldwin. In 1968, Troupe edited the anthology Watts Poets: A Book of New Poetry and Essays.

His work is associated with Black Arts Movement writers such as Amiri Baraka, Nikki Giovanni, Wanda Coleman, Haki Madhubuti and Ishmael Reed, who were also friends. Their work was diverse but was strongly informed by world literature and jazz music. Some time later it emerged that the Workshop had been a target of the covert FBI counterintelligence program COINTELPRO, and that the Workshop, along with its theater, were burned to the ground in 1973 by the FBI informant and infiltrator, Darthard Perry (a.k.a. Ed Riggs). It also emerged that Riggs had not only been sabotaging equipment at the Workshop but also used his association with it to infiltrate the Los Angeles chapter of the Black Panthers, and numerous other organizations that promoted black culture, ultimately being instrumental in their demise.

Career
Throughout the 1970s Troupe lived in New York, teaching at the College of Staten Island. During that time he was a regular on the poetry circuit, performing alone or in groups around the country.

In 1985 Spin magazine hired Troupe to write an exclusive two-part interview with Miles Davis, which led Simon & Schuster to him as co-author for Davis's autobiography. Miles: The Autobiography was published in 1990 and won an American Book Award for the authors, garnering them numerous positive reviews and accolades.

From 1991 to 2003 Troupe was professor of Caribbean and American literatures and creative writing at the University of California, San Diego, in La Jolla, California.

On June 11, 2002, Troupe was appointed California's first poet laureate by then Governor Gray Davis. A background check related to the new political appointment revealed that Troupe had, in fact, never possessed a degree from Grambling; he attended for only two semesters in 1957–58 and then dropped out. After admitting that he had not earned a degree, he made the decision to resign, rather have it become a political issue for the Democratic Governor. As a consequence, Troupe resigned from the poet laureate's position in October 2002 and retired from his post at UCSD.

Shortly after the controversy, Troupe moved back to New York City.

The year 2006 saw the publishing of his collaboration with self-made millionaire Chris Gardner on the latter's autobiography, The Pursuit of Happyness. The book served as the inspiration for a film of the same name later that year starring Will Smith.

Other notable works by Troupe include James Baldwin: The Legacy (1989) and Miles and Me: A Memoir of Miles Davis (2000). He also edited Giant Talk: An Anthology of Third World Writing (1975) and is a founding editor of Confrontation: A Journal of Third World Literature and American Rag.

Troupe currently lives in New York City with his wife, Margaret.

Books

 Miles and Me, Seven Stories Press (2018)
 Earl the Pearl: My Story by Earl Monroe & Quincy Troupe, Rodale Press (2013)
 Errançities, New Poems, Coffee House Press (2011)
 The Architecture of Language, Coffee House Press (2006)
 The Pursuit of Happyness, by Chris Gardner and Quincy Troupe, HarperCollins/Amistad (2006)
 Little Stevie Wonder, A children's book, Houghton-Mifflin (2005)
 Transcircularities; New and Selected Poems, Coffee House Press, October (2002)
 Take it to the Hoop Magic Johnson, a children's book, Jump At The Sun, a division of Hyperion/Disney Books of Children (2001)
 Miles and Me, University of California Press (2000)
 Choruses, poems, Coffee House Press (1999)
 Avalanche, poems, Coffee House Press (1996)
 Weather Reports: New and Selected Poems, Harlem River Press, New York and London (1991)
 Miles: The Autobiography, Miles Davis with Quincy Troupe, Quincy Troupe, Co-author, Simon & Schuster, New York, 1989
 James Baldwin: The Legacy ed., Touchstone Press (Simon & Schuster), New York (1989)
 Skulls Along the River, poems, Quincy Troupe, I. Reed Books, New York (1984)
 Snake-Back Solos: Selected Poems 1969-1977, Quincy Troupe, I. Reed Books, New York (1979)
 The Inside Story of T.V.'s Roots, Quincy Troupe and David L. Wolper, Warner Books, New York (1978) 
 Giant Talk: An Anthology of Third World Writing, Rainer Schulte and Quincy Troupe, eds., Random House, New York (1972)
 Embryo, Quincy Troupe, Balenmir House, New York (1972)
 Watts Poets and Writers, Quincy Troupe, ed., House of Respect, California (1968)

References

External links
90.3 WCPN
Fall From Grace, from The Chronicle of Higher Education, April 4, 2003.
Interview with Quicy Troupe regarding his relationship with Miles Davis, from This American Life, April 19, 1996.
Quincy Troupe papers, 1915–2008 Schomburg Center for Research in Black Culture, The New York Public Library.
 Photographs and posters featuring Quincy Troupe from the EBR African American Cultural Life digital collection, Southern Illinois University Edwardsville.

1939 births
Living people
American male poets
African-American poets
Poets from California
Poets from Missouri
Poets from Illinois
People from St. Clair County, Illinois
Poets Laureate of California
American Book Award winners
21st-century African-American people
20th-century African-American people
African-American male writers